Chaiyawat Buran (born 26 October 1996) is a Thai professional footballer who plays as a winger for Thai League 1 club Lamphun Warriors and the Thailand national team.

International goals

Under-23

Honours

Club
Muangthong United
 Thai League 1 (1): 2016
 Thai League Cup (1): 2016

Chiangrai United
Thai League 1 (1): 2019
 Thai FA Cup (3): 2017, 2018, 2020–21
 Thailand Champions Cup (2): 2018, 2020
 Thai League Cup (1): 2018

International
Thailand U-23
 Sea Games  Gold Medal (1) : 2017
 Dubai Cup (1) :  2017
Thailand U-21
 Nations Cup (1) : 2016

External links

1996 births
Living people
Chaiyawat Buran
Association football wingers
Association football fullbacks
Chaiyawat Buran
Chaiyawat Buran
Chaiyawat Buran
Chaiyawat Buran
Chaiyawat Buran
Chaiyawat Buran
Chaiyawat Buran
Chaiyawat Buran
Chaiyawat Buran
Southeast Asian Games medalists in football
Footballers at the 2018 Asian Games
Competitors at the 2017 Southeast Asian Games
Chaiyawat Buran